WPMR-LP (95.7 FM) is a radio station licensed to serve Russellville, Alabama.  The station is owned by Provision Ministry. It airs a Southern Gospel music format.

History
This station received its original construction permit from the Federal Communications Commission on April 8, 2003.  The new station was assigned the call letters WPMR-LP by the FCC on June 18, 2003.  WPMR-LP received its license to cover from the FCC on June 18, 2004.

Previously the WPMR callsign (for "Pocono Mountain Radio") had been assigned to WPMR (960 AM, later WPLY) and WPMR-FM (107.9 FM, now WKRF) in Mount Pocono/Tobyhanna Township, Pennsylvania.

References

External links

WPMR-LP service area per the FCC database

PMR-LP
Southern Gospel radio stations in the United States
Radio stations established in 2003
Franklin County, Alabama
PMR-LP